Kalolimnos is a small Greek island in the Dodecanese chain, lying between Kalymnos and Imia, opposite the coast of Turkey, in the Aegean Sea. It is part of the municipality of Kalymnos.

Kalolimnos reaches an altitude of 80 meters above sea level and has a total area of 1.95 km2.

Population
As of the 2011 census, two citizens lived in Kalolimnos, and a permanent garrison is stationed there. The island is steep and rocky and has a population of wild goats.

Infrastructure
Kalolimnos features an old lighthouse which was constructed in 1864 by the French Company of Ottoman Lighthouses and a military building with a permanent army garrison.

European migrant crisis
During the European migrant crisis, Kalolimnos has been in the frontline of Greek islands that have witnessed the arrival of immigrants from Turkey and is the area where in October 2015 a migrant boat has capsized due to the bad weather, resulting to the drowning of four Syrian children. Operations were held by the Greek authorities for the rescue of the remaining survivors who then were transported to Kalymnos.

References

Islands of Greece
Dodecanese
Kalymnos
Landforms of Kalymnos (regional unit)
Islands of the South Aegean